Lieutenant-General Henry James "Kalfie" Martin  (10 June 191020 October 2000) was a South African military commander.

Military career 
He joined the South African Air Force in 1935 and played rugby union for his country in 1937. During World War II, he commanded 3 Wing in North Africa (1942–1943), and in 1945 he commanded 4 Group, which was responsible for transporting South African servicemen back home from Italy. He was CO of AFB Waterkloof from 1949 to 1951.

He served as Quartermaster-General from 1 December 1953 to 31 October 1959, Air Chief of Staff (1 May 1965 to 30 June 1966) as Chief of the Air Force from 1 July 1966 to 30 November 1967, and as Chief of Defence Staff from 1 December 1967 to 31 December 1968.

Awards and decorations

Rugby career
In 1937 he toured with the Springboks to Australia and New Zealand. He played his first and only test match against Australia on 17 July 1937. He also played 15 tour matches.

Test history

See also
List of South African military chiefs
South African Air Force
List of South Africa national rugby union players – Springbok no. 256

References

|-

1910 births
2000 deaths
South African people of British descent
White South African people
South African military personnel of World War II
South Africa international rugby union players
Recipients of the Distinguished Flying Cross (United Kingdom)
People from Bloemfontein
Chiefs of the South African Air Force
South African Commanders of the Order of the British Empire
Graduates of the RAF Staff College, Bracknell
Rugby union players from Bloemfontein
Rugby union props
Golden Lions players